Eff is a functional programming language similar in syntax to OCaml which integrates the functionality of algebraic effect handlers.

References 

Programming languages created in 2012
OCaml programming language family
Functional languages